The Philippine Institute of Sports Football and Athletics Stadium, formerly known as the ULTRA Stadium (University of Life Training and Recreational Arena), is a stadium located inside the PhilSports Complex in Oranbo, Pasig, Metro Manila, Philippines. It was the host of the 2002 World Cup qualifiers between Philippines and Laos.

The stadium was the site of the PhilSports Stadium stampede on February 4, 2006.

Its capacity was 15,000 people.

See also
PhilSports Complex
PhilSports Stadium stampede

References

Sports venues in Metro Manila
Athletics (track and field) venues in the Philippines
Football venues in the Philippines
Buildings and structures in Pasig
American football venues in the Philippines